"Ko Ko Korina" (Urdu:) is a song which appeared in the 1966 Urdu-language film Armaan and is considered the first pop song of Pakistan, and often of all South Asia. Produced during the Golden Age of Pakistani cinema, the song's lyrics were written by Masroor Anwar and the music composed by Sohail Rana. Ahmed Rushdi was the playback singer, with actor Waheed Murad lip-syncing.

Background

In 1966, actor-producer Waheed Murad made his film Armaan in which Sohail Rana came up with a pop song "Ko ko Korina" which got a full house success not only all over the country but also all over South Asia. Playback singer Ahmed Rushdi recorded this song. 

Following Rushdi's success, Christian bands specialising in jazz started performing at various night clubs and hotel lobbies in Karachi, Hyderabad, Mumbai, Dhaka and Lahore.

Remakes
The 2013 Geo TV television film Armaan, featured the song in a new version, with a few English lyrics. The song was sung by Sana Zulfiqar and Aamir Zaki, and was picturized on Fawad Khan, Aamina Sheikh, Jahanzaib Khan and Mahnoor Khan.

In August 2018, Coke Studio produced a remake of "Ko Ko Korina", originally lip-sync by Waheed Murad in the voices of Momina Mustehsan and Ahad Raza Mir. Their rendition of this Pakistani classic was widely criticized. Within a few days of the video being released on YouTube, it became the most-disliked video in the music show's 11-year history and raised nationwide hue and cry to the extent that Minister for Human Rights in Pakistan Shireen Mazari had to come out in media to term the remake as "horrendous". Waheed Murad's son Adil Murad also apologized from Pakistani nation for allowing Coke Studio a remake of the song. In 2022, Ko Ko Korina featured in the opening scene of American series Ms. Marvel (TV series) and won top ratings.

References 

1966 songs
Pakistani pop songs
Urdu-language songs